Children Ruin Everything is a Canadian sitcom television series, that premiered on CTV on January 12, 2022. Created by Kurt Smeaton for CTV and Roku and co-produced by New Metric Media and Bell Media Studios, the series focuses on Astrid (Meaghan Rath) and James (Aaron Abrams), a young couple struggling to define their lives outside of their role as parents.

Smeaton described the series as inspired by his understanding that parenting "is time-consuming and expensive and frustrating. So I wanted to create a show that acknowledged that but also showed the other side, which is having a family is worth it.”

The series is executive produced by Chuck Tatham, alongside Smeaton and Mark Montefiore. In the United States, it streamed on The Roku Channel on May 13, 2022 as part of their Roku Originals line-up.

On February 4, 2022, CTV and Roku renewed the series for a second season, which premiered on September 19, 2022 and premiered in the US on February 3, 2023, with the first 8 episodes of the season released, with the second 8-episode half releasing at a later date.

Cast and characters 
 Meaghan Rath as Astrid, a mother of three
 Aaron Abrams as James, Astrid's husband, a father of three
 Ennis Esmer as Ennis, James's best friend and co-worker
 Nazneen Contractor as Dawn, Astrid's sister
 Logan Nicholson as Felix, Astrid and James's seven-year-old (eight-year-old) son
 Mikayla SwamiNathan as Viv, Astrid and James's four-year-old daughter 
 Dmitry Chepovetsky as Bo, Dawn's husband 
 Darius Rota as Corey, Dawn and Bo's 10-year-old son
 Veena Sood as Nisha, Astrid and Dawn's mother
 Lisa Codrington as Marla, James and Ennis's boss

Episodes

Season 1 (2022)

Season 2 (2022-23)

References

External links

2020s Canadian sitcoms
2022 Canadian television series debuts
CTV Television Network original programming
Television series about couples
Television series about children
Television series by Bell Media
English-language television shows